Mediodactylus is a genus of Gekkonidae (gecko) family. It contains the following species:

Species
Species in alphabetical order by specific name:

 Lebanese thin-toed gecko, Mediodactylus amictopholis 
 Iranian gecko, Mediodactylus aspratilis 
 Barton's thin-toed gecko, Mediodactylus bartoni 
 Short-limbed bend-toed gecko, Mediodactylus brachykolon 
 Mediterranean thin-toed gecko, Mediodactylus danilewskii 
 Asia Minor thin-toed gecko, Mediodactylus heterocercus 
 Iraqi gecko, Mediodactylus heteropholis 
 Ilamian keel-scaled gecko, Mediodactylus ilamensis 
 Kotschy's gecko, Mediodactylus kotschyi 
 Mediodactylus narynensis 
 Mediodactylus oertzeni  
 Mediodactylus orientalis  
 Mediodactylus russowi  
 Jaz Murian bent-toed gecko, Mediodactylus sagittifer 
 Kopet Dagh bent-toed gecko, Mediodactylus spinicauda 
 Mediodactylus stevenandersoni  
 Chitral gecko, Mediodactylus walli

References

 
Lizard genera